Renaissance (also known as Renesans) is a 1964 French reverse stop-motion animation short film directed by Walerian Borowczyk.  The opening credits of the short include a dedication to experimental filmmaker Hy Hirsh, who died from a heart attack in 1961.

Plot
An explosion reveals an obliterated corner of a room, and the remnants of several objects. They begin to reconstruct themselves, becoming books, a doll, a stuffed owl, and a trumpet. Books and furniture reassemble themselves. Finally, a bomb pieces itself back together and explodes, reducing the items to debris once more.

Themes 
Film critic Raymond Durgnat describes Renaissance as "a remembrance of things past, a meditation on a peasant-bourgeois stability, on what in it was life-affirming, what life-denying ... Implicit in the film is the question whether any human order can avoid destruction."

Release

Home media 
Arrow Films released a high-definition restoration of the film in Walerian Borowczyk: Short Films and Animations, one of five volumes included in Camera Obscura: The Walerian Borowczyk Collection, a dual-format box set released on 8 September 2014. The collection was limited to a thousand copies. Bonus content included an introduction by filmmaker Terry Gilliam; Film Is Not a Sausage, a featurette about Borowczyk's short films, with archival footage of the filmmaker and interviews with director André Heinrich, producer Dominique Duvergé-Ségrétin, and composer Bernard Parmegiani; Blow Ups, a visual essay by Daniel Bird about Borowczyk's paintings and poster work; a 32-page essay featuring essays and reviews on the director's work, as well as detailed restoration and projection notes; and several commercials made by Borowczyk during his career.

Olive Films also released a Blu-ray collection of the director's short films from 1959 through to 1984, The Walerian Borowczyk Short Film Collection, on 25 April 2017.

Reception 
Renaissance won the Solvay Prize and the Prize of the International Federation of Film Critics at the 1963 Knokke-le-Zoute International Experimental Film Festival. The film was also awarded the Jury's Special Prize at the 1963 International Film Festival Tours.

The film was screened out-of-competition at the 1965 Annecy International Animation Film Festival. In 2012, Renaissance was nominated for Fantastic Entertainment at the French Fantastic Cinema Retrospective.

References

External links
 

1960s French-language films
1964 animated films
1964 films
1960s animated short films
French animated short films
1964 short films
1960s French animated films